Major-General Thomas Julian Bateman,  is a senior British Army officer who has served as General Officer Commanding 1st (United Kingdom) Division since September 2022.

Military career
Bateman was commissioned in the Royal Scots Dragoon Guards on 9 September 1990. He became Commander of 11 Infantry Brigade and Headquarters South East in  August 2018, Assistant Chief of Staff, Operations at Permanent Joint Headquarters in November 2020 and General Officer Commanding 1st (United Kingdom) Division in September 2022.

He was appointed a Member of the Order of the British Empire in the 2011 New Year Honours and was advanced to Commander of the Order of the British Empire for services in the field in 15 September 2017.

References

Living people
Commanders of the Order of the British Empire
British Army major generals
Year of birth missing (living people)